Bakossi may refer to:
Bakossi Forest Reserve, a protected area in Cameroon
Bakossi language, one of the languages of Cameroon
Bakossi Mountains, a mountain range in Cameroon
Bakossi people, an indigenous group in Cameroon